Evanston Central Street is the northernmost of the three commuter railroad stations in Evanston, Illinois. It is an elevated station at Green Bay Road and Central Street, surrounded by a neighborhood of stores, restaurants and multi-story apartment buildings. Just north of the station, the tracks descend to grade and pass through Wilmette on ground level.

Evanston Central Street station is served by Metra's Union Pacific North Line, with service south to Ogilvie Transportation Center in Chicago and as far north as Kenosha, Wisconsin. In Metra's zone-based fare system, Evanston Central Street is in zone C. As of 2018, Evanston Central Street is the 27th busiest of Metra's 236 non-downtown stations, with an average of 1,346 weekday boardings. There are two platforms: northbound trains stop at the west platform, and southbound trains stop at the east platform. Evanston Central Street has a station house on the east platform. The station house contains a ticket booth as well as a coffee and pastry shop named "Upstairs Cafe" owned and run by three Evanston women, two of whom are professional bakers. The station house is open from 5:15 a.m. to 1:15 p.m. and a ticket agent is present during these hours on weekdays.

As of December 5, 2022, Evanston Central St. is served by 59 trains (30 inbound and 29 outbound) on weekdays, by 11 trains in each direction on Saturdays, and by eight trains in each direction on Sundays. During the summer concert season, the extra weekend train to  also stops here.

This is the closest Metra station to Northwestern University's sports complex at Ryan Field. The 15th hole fairway and 16th hole tee box of the Canal Shores Golf Course adjoin this Metra station. The Chicago Transit Authority's Central station on the Purple Line is less than a mile to the east.

Bus connections 
CTA
  201 Central/Ridge 
  206 Evanston Circulator 

Pace
  213 Green Bay Road

References

External links 

Lincoln Street entrance from Google Maps Street View
Central Street entrance from Google Maps Street View

Metra stations in Illinois
Former Chicago and North Western Railway stations
Central Street (Metra)
Railway stations in the United States opened in 1911
Union Pacific North Line